Mount Repose is a census-designated place (CDP) in Miami Township, Clermont County, Ohio, United States. The population was 4,672 at the 2010 census.

History
Mount Repose had its start in the 1820s when a small country store was established there. A post office called Mount Repose opened in 1867, and remained in operation until 1907.

Geography
It is bordered to the west by Mulberry and to the south by Day Heights. Ohio State Route 28 passes through Mount Repose, leading northeast  to Goshen and southwest  to Milford.

Demographics

As of the census of 2000, there were 4,102 people, 1,481 households, and 1,158 families residing in the CDP. The population density was 2,103.6 people per square mile (812.2/km2). There were 1,526 housing units at an average density of 782.6/sq mi (302.1/km2). The racial makeup of the CDP was 97.03% White, 1.05% African American, 0.20% Native American, 0.68% Asian, 0.10% from other races, and 0.95% from two or more races. Hispanic or Latino of any race were 0.85% of the population.

There were 1,481 households, out of which 41.1% had children under the age of 18 living with them, 66.7% were married couples living together, 8.1% had a female householder with no husband present, and 21.8% were non-families. 18.6% of all households were made up of individuals, and 7.5% had someone living alone who was 65 years of age or older. The average household size was 2.77 and the average family size was 3.18.

In the CDP the population was spread out, with 28.7% under the age of 18, 7.3% from 18 to 24, 32.4% from 25 to 44, 23.4% from 45 to 64, and 8.2% who were 65 years of age or older. The median age was 34 years. For every 100 females there were 95.1 males. For every 100 females age 18 and over, there were 94.2 males.

The median income for a household in the CDP was $56,019, and the median income for a family was $62,770. Males had a median income of $42,520 versus $31,448 for females. The per capita income for the CDP was $21,303. About 3.3% of families and 5.1% of the population were below the poverty line, including 6.3% of those under age 18 and 7.4% of those age 65 or over.

Gallery

References

Census-designated places in Clermont County, Ohio